= 2017 Thane Municipal Corporation election =

Indian local election

- 21 February 2017

All 131 seats in Thane Municipal Corporation 65 seats needed for a majority

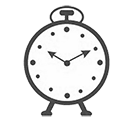

	First party	Second party	Third party
Party	SS	NCP	BJP
Last election	54	34	7
Seats won	67	34	23
Seat change	▲13	Steady	▲16
	Fourth party	Fifth party
Party	INC	AIMIM
Last election	18
Seats won	3	2
Seat change	▼15	▲2
TMC majority before election
SHS
Elected TMC majority
SHS

The Thane Municipal Corporation election was held on 21 February 2017, for the City of Thane, Maharashtra, India. The main contenders for the election were the ruling Shiv Sena, Nationalist Congress Party, Bharatiya Janata Party and the Indian National Congress.

== Results ==
The ruling Shiv Sena became the largest party with gaining Majority, The Nationalist Congress Party won the same number of seats it won in 2012 in Thane Municipal Corporation Election, The Bharatiya Janata Party improved its performance.

Party	Seats	+/–
Shiv Sena	67	+13
Nationalist Congress Party	34	0
Bharatiya Janata Party	23	+16
Indian National Congress	3	–15
All India Majlis-e-Ittehadul Muslimeen	2	+2
Independents	2	–5
Total	131	0

=== By ward ===
Ward No.	Seats	Shivsena		Nationalist Congress Party		Bharatiya Janata Party		Indian National Congress		All India Majilis-e-Ittehadul Muslimeen		Other
1.	4	04	▲1	00	▼1	00	▼1	00	▼1	00	Steady	00
2.	4	00	Steady	00	▼1	04	▲4	00	▼1	00	Steady	00
3.	4	04	▲4	00	▼1	00	Steady	00	▼1	00	Steady	00
4.	4	01	▲1	00	▼1	03	▲3	00	▼1	00	Steady	00
5.	4	04	▲4	00	▼1	00	Steady	00	▼1	00	Steady	00
6.	4	00	▼1	04	▲4	00	Steady	00	▼1	00	Steady	00
7.	4	03	▼1	00	Steady	00	Steady	01	▲1	00	Steady	00
8.	4	04	▲4	00	Steady	00	Steady	00	▼1	00	Steady	00
9.	4	04	▲4	00	Steady	00	Steady	00	▼1	00	Steady	00
10.	4	00	▼4	04	▲1	00	Steady	00	▼1	00	Steady	00
11.	4	00	▼4	00	▼1	04	▲4	00	▼1	00	Steady	00
12.	4	02	▲1	00	▼2	02	▲1	00	▼1	00	Steady	00
13.	4	04	▲4	00	▼1	00	▼1	00	▼1	00	Steady	00
14.	4	04	▲4	00	▼1	00	▼1	00	▼1	00	Steady	00
15.	4	01	▼3	00	▼1	03	▲3	00	▼2	00	Steady	00
16.	4	04	▲1	00	▼1	00	▼1	00	Steady	00	Steady	00
17.	4	04	▲1	00	▼1	00	Steady	00	Steady	00	Steady	00
18.	4	04	Steady	00	Steady	00	▼1	00	Steady	00	Steady	00
19.	4	04	▲2	00	▼1	00	▼1	00	Steady	00	Steady	00
20.	4	03	▲2	00	▼4	01	▲1	00	Steady	00	Steady	00
21.	4	00	Steady	00	Steady	04	▲4	00	Steady	00	Steady	00
22.	4	02	▲2	00	Steady	02	▲2	00	Steady	00	Steady	00
23.	4	00	▼4	04	▲4	00	Steady	00	Steady	00	Steady	00
24.	4	02	▲2	01	Steady	00	▲2	00	Steady	00	Steady	01
25.	4	01	▼1	03	▲4	00	Steady	00	Steady	00	Steady	00
26.	4	00	▼4	01	▲1	00	Steady	02	▲2	00	Steady	01
27.	4	04	▲2	00	▼4	00	Steady	00	Steady	00	Steady	00
28.	4	04	▲2	00	▼4	00	Steady	00	Steady	00	Steady	00
29.	4	00	▼2	04	▲4	00	Steady	00	Steady	00	Steady	01
30.	4	00	▼1	04	▲4	00	Steady	00	Steady	00	Steady	00
31.	4	00	▼1	04	▲4	00	Steady	00	Steady	00	Steady	00
32.	4	00	▼1	04	▲4	00	Steady	00	Steady	00	Steady	00
33.	4	00	▼1	02	▼4	00	Steady	00	Steady	02	▲2	00
Total	131	67	▲13	34	Steady	23	▲16	3	▼15	2	▲2	
Source: India.com
